The Malpas Mystery is a 1960 British 'B' movie crime film, directed by Sidney Hayers. Although originally made by Independent Artists at Beaconsfield studios, it was included in the Merton Park series of Edgar Wallace Mysteries. When Audrey is released from prison, she finds herself embroiled with mysterious doctors, missing heirs, diamonds and murder.

Cast
Maureen Swanson as	Audrey Bedford
Allan Cuthbertson as Lacey Marshalt
Geoffrey Keen as Torrington
Ronald Howard as Dick Shannon
Sandra Dorne as Dora Elton
Alan Tilvern as Gordon Seager
Leslie French as Witkins
Catherine Feller as Jinette
Richard Shaw as Kornfeldt
Sheila Allen as Frau Kornfeldt
Edward Cast as Laker

Cinema release
The Malpas Mystery went on general release on the ABC Cinemas circuit from September 17th 1961 as supporting film for Raising the Wind. Both films featured prominent roles for Geoffrey Keen.

Critical reception
The Spinning Image called it "One of the best of the ‘Edgar Wallace’ series (if we accept it as one of the series), The Malpas Mystery is very impressively filmed for a cheap second feature and a step above the rather flat and boring items of the same period."

References

External links

The Malpas Mystery at BFI
The Malpas Mystery at Letterbox
Review at Spinning Image

1960 films
1960 crime films
British crime films
British black-and-white films
Edgar Wallace Mysteries
1960s English-language films
Films directed by Sidney Hayers
1960s British films